Arroyo de Salas is a town in the province of Burgos, Spain. It is part of the municipality of Salas de los Infantes.

Towns in Spain
Populated places in the Province of Burgos
Province of Burgos